Shimon Harush (born 20 February 1987) is an Israeli footballer who currently plays for Maccabi Kiryat Ata.

Career
Harush started his career at the youth department of Hapoel Haifa. He first played in the Israeli Premier League in 2009–10.

In January 2013 Harush signed at Hapoel Tel Aviv.

Notes

1987 births
Living people
Israeli footballers
Association football defenders
Hapoel Haifa F.C. players
Maccabi Ahi Nazareth F.C. players
Hapoel Be'er Sheva F.C. players
Hapoel Acre F.C. players
Bnei Sakhnin F.C. players
Hapoel Tel Aviv F.C. players
Maccabi Netanya F.C. players
F.C. Haifa Robi Shapira players
Ironi Nesher F.C. players
Hapoel Iksal F.C. players
Hapoel Ironi Baqa al-Gharbiyye F.C. players
Maccabi Ironi Tamra F.C. players
Maccabi Ironi Kiryat Ata F.C. players
Liga Leumit players
Israeli Premier League players
Footballers from Kiryat Motzkin
Israeli people of Moroccan-Jewish descent